Vienna is a town in Fairfax County, Virginia, United States. As of the 2020 U.S. census, Vienna has a population of 16,473. Significantly more people live in ZIP codes with the Vienna postal addresses (22180, 22181, and 22182), bordered approximately by Interstate 66 on the south, Interstate 495 on the east, Route 7 to the north, and Hunter Mill Road to the west, than in the town itself.

History

Non-native settlement in the region dates to ca. 1740. In 1754, prominent soldier and land owner Colonel Charles Broadwater settled within the town boundaries. Broadwater's son-in-law, John Hunter built the first recorded house there in 1767, naming it Ayr Hill to recall his birthplace, Ayr, Scotland. That name was then applied to the tiny developing community. The name of the town was changed in the 1850s, when a doctor, William Hendrick, settled there if the town renamed itself after his hometown, Phelps, New York, which was then known as Vienna.

On June 17, 1861, a relatively-minor but widely noted military engagement occurred there, the Battle of Vienna, one of the earliest armed clashes of the American Civil War. A would-be Union occupation unit under Brigadier General Robert C. Schenck approached Vienna from the east by train but was ambushed and forced to retreat by a superior Confederate force led by Colonel Maxcy Gregg. Today, several historical markers in Vienna detail its Civil War history.  In addition, in the center of town lies the well preserved Freeman House; which, in 1861, was the polling place for the secession vote and was used during the war by both sides as a hospital. The house has been turned into a museum and gift shop.

The First Baptist Church of Vienna was founded in 1867, and the original church structure was built using Union Army barracks lumber obtained through the Freedmen's Bureau. This church building was also the town's first black public school. The first white public school was built in 1872. A permanent black elementary school was built, which was later named for its long-time principal, Louise Archer. Fairfax County Schools were completely desegregated by the Fall of 1965.

Geography

Wolftrap Creek, a tributary of nearby Difficult Run, flows north from its source in the eastern part of town. The Bear Branch of Accotink Creek, a Potomac tributary, flows south from its source in the southern part of town.

As a suburb of Washington, D.C., Vienna is a part of both the Washington metropolitan area and the larger Washington–Baltimore combined statistical area. It is bordered on all sides by other Washington suburbs, including: Wolf Trap to the north, Tysons Corner to the northeast, Dunn Loring to the east, Merrifield to the south, and Oakton to the west. These communities are unincorporated, and portions of them lie in ZIP codes with Vienna postal addresses despite lying outside the town's borders.

Demographics

As of the 2020 census, there were 16,473 people, 5,424 households, and 4,215 families residing in the town. The racial makeup of the town was 74.4% White, 13.7% Asian, 9.8% Hispanic or Latino, 2.2% African American, 0.4% Native American, and 7.8% from two or more races.

There were 5,424 households, out of which 39.6% had children under the age of 18 living with them, 63.4% were married couples living together, 3.7% had a male householder with no wife present, 9.1% had a female householder with no husband present, and 23.8% were non-families. 18.2% of all households were made up of individuals, and 8.1% had someone living alone who was 65 years of age or older. The average household size was 2.84, and the average family size was 3.19.

In the town, the population was spread out, with 28% under the age of 18, 6.1% from 18 to 24, 24.7% from 25 to 44, 30.3% from 45 to 64, and 13.9% who were 65 years of age or older. The median age was 40.7 years. For every 100 females, there were 99.5 males. For every 100 females age 18 and over, there were 97.1 males age 18 and over.

As of 2009, the median income for a household in the town was $113,817, and the median income for a family was $124,895. Males had a median income of $88,355 versus $66,642 for females. The per capita income for the town was $49,544. About 3.7% of families and 5.9% of the population were below the poverty line, including 6.5% of those under age 18 and 2.9% of those age 65 or over.

Vienna's median home price was $820,000 in 2017, one of the highest in the nation.

Education

Primary and secondary schools
The town is served by Fairfax County Public Schools.

Vienna is served by three high schools (Oakton, Madison, and Marshall); two middle schools (Kilmer and Thoreau), and seven elementary schools. However, of all the schools Vienna students attend, only four public and one private are actually within the town limits: Cunningham Park Elementary School, Marshall Road Elementary School, Louise Archer Elementary School, Vienna Elementary School and Green Hedges School.

Vienna has one independent school, Green Hedges, accredited by the Virginia Association of Independent Schools. Green Hedges has students from ages 3– 5 (Montessori preschool and kindergarten program) through preparatory grades 1–8. Founded in 1942 by Frances and Kenton Kilmer, the School was relocated to the Windsor Heights area of Vienna in 1955.

Vienna also has one independent Catholic school, Oakcrest School, which was founded in 1976 and moved to its permanent campus in Vienna in 2017, and two Catholic elementary schools: St. Mark Catholic School and Our Lady of Good Counsel Catholic School.

The music program at James Madison High School includes a marching band, "The Pride of Vienna", and color guard, two symphonic bands, jazz band, orchestra, and chorus. The Crew team at James Madison has won many awards.  The novice team has won states three years in a row In addition, the Women's Junior Eight of 2010 won second in the nation as well as Virginia States.  Their Team sent all their boats but two, to the nationals in Saratoga.  Their Varsity Baseball team has won 26 District titles, 6 Region titles, and 4 State titles (1968, 1971, 2002, 2015), led by Coach Mark "Pudge" Gjormand's 20-year run which produced 19 of the 36 titles (14 district, 3 region, and 2 state). A water tower stating "Home of the Warhawks" can be seen towering over the school. Also, more recently, the Madison Men's Lacrosse team, coached by coach of the year, Arron Solomon, won the District, Regional, and State championship in the spring of 2019. The 2019 lacrosse team was the first team at James Madison to win a state championship and did so without any players committed to a college team.

Thoreau Middle School shares a class with Joyce Kilmer Middle School (also located in Vienna) and Longfellow Middle School (located in Falls Church). Kilmer had accelerated programs for students that have passed certain aptitude tests, known as the Advanced Academic Program (AAP) program. This program has also been introduced into Luther Jackson Middle School. Kilmer also has a band and orchestra program, and recently started up a Science Olympiad and Chess Club program.

Close to Madison sit the seven elementary schools: Flint Hill Elementary (not to be confused with Flint Hill School, a private school in neighboring Oakton, Virginia), Louise Archer (which also has an AAP program), Marshall Road, Oakton Elementary  (a feeder school into Oakton and Madison High Schools), Vienna Elementary, Wolftrap, and Cunningham Park. Each of these schools send graduates into Thoreau, Kilmer, Luther Jackson Middle School or Longfellow, and afterwards James Madison High School, Oakton High School (just outside Vienna on the border with Oakton, with a Vienna address), George C. Marshall High School (in the Falls Church area of Fairfax County), Falls Church High School (just outside Vienna in Merrifield) or McLean High School. Freedom Hill Elementary, which recently started an Advanced Academic program, sends graduates to Kilmer, and afterward to Thomas Jefferson High School for Science and Technology or Marshall High School. Residents of Vienna who live along the town's border with Great Falls, VA also send graduates into Langley High School via Cooper Middle School. Because of the large influx of new residents in the last decade, the classes of '09, '10, and '11 at these regional high schools are expected to be the largest over the next ten years.

Public libraries
Fairfax County Public Library operates the Patrick Henry Library in Vienna.

Transportation

Interstate 66 is the main highway serving Vienna. Access is provided via Exit 62 and Virginia State Route 243. In addition, Virginia State Route 123 runs through downtown Vienna.

Economy
MAE-East is located within the Vienna postal area in Tysons Corner CDP. This served as one of two locations (in addition to MAE-West) where all Internet traffic was exchanged between one ISP and other private, government, and academic Internet networks and served as a magnet for telecom and other high-tech companies focused on the Internet. In 1995 America Online (AOL) was headquartered at 8619 Westwood Center Drive in Tysons Corner CDP in unincorporated Fairfax County, near Vienna.

The global corporate headquarters of Navy Federal Credit Union is located in Vienna.

Top employers 

According to the Town's 2020 Comprehensive Annual Financial Report, the top employers in the town are:

{| class="wikitable"
|-
! #
! Employer
! # of Employees
|-
| 1
|Navy Federal Credit Union
|2,500+
|-
| 2
|Fairfax County Public Schools
|500–999
|-
| 3
|Contemporary Electrical Services, Inc
|100–249
|-
| 4
|Giant Foods
|100–249
|-
| 5
|Whole Foods Market Group
|100–249
|-
| 6
|Town of Vienna
|100–249
|-
| 7
|Westwood Country Club
|100–249
|-
| 8
|Wheat's Lawn and Custom Land Inc
|100–249
|-
| 9
|The Hope Center for Advanced Veterinary Medicine
|100–249
|-
| 10
|U.S. Postal Service
|50–99
|}

Recreation 
The W&OD Trail crosses through downtown Vienna. Several parks are located near the town, including Meadowlark Botanical Gardens and Wolf Trap National Park for the Performing Arts. The town green and Jammin' Java coffeehouse and music club serve as areas for theatre and musical performances.

Notable people 
Many of these residents live outside the town but in the Vienna postal delivery area.

 Holly Seibold, Non-profit leader, former teacher at Vienna Elementary School, and Democratic nominee for Virginia House of Delegates District 35 in the January 10th Special Election
 Lillian Elvira Moore Abbot, painter, born in Vienna
 Yussur A.F. Abrar, former Governor of the Central Bank of Somalia
 Angela Aki, singer
 Alex Albrecht, host of Digg.com's popular podcast Diggnation, along with Kevin Rose
Mike Baker (CIA officer), former CIA operations officer and frequent FOX News Contributor. Also appeared on Spike TV's Deadliest Warrior in CIA vs KGB
 David Baldacci, popular author
 Sandra Beasley, poet
 Reva Beck Bosone, former member of the United States House of Representatives
 Gordon L. Brady, economist and writer
 Steve Buckhantz, Washington Wizards play-by-play announcer
 Ian Caldwell, author
 David Chang, chef and restaurateur
 Tom Davis, former Republican member of the United States House of Representatives
 John M. Dowd, lawyer
 Trevor N. Dupuy, United States Army colonel and noted historian
 Bill Emerson (musician), hall of fame bluegrass banjoist, founding member of The Country Gentlemen
 Billy Lee Evans, former member of the United States House of Representatives
 Kyle Foggo, former U.S. federal government intelligence officer convicted of bribery
 Hrach Gregorian, political consultant, educator, and writer
 Katherine Hadford, figure skater
 Robert Hanssen, spy for USSR and Russia while a Federal Bureau of Investigation counterespionage agent
 Charles DeLano Hine, American civil engineer, lawyer, railway official, and Colonel in the United States Army during Spanish–American War. Inherited estate and lands held in Town by father Orrin E. Hine.
 Orrin E. Hine, Major in the Union Army, 50th New York Engineers, during American Civil War. After the war, held large estate and lands in Town.
 Spencer Heath, inventor of the reversible pitch airplane propeller
 William G. Hundley, criminal defense attorney for high-profile clients, died in 2006 in Vienna
 Mark Keam, former member of the Virginia House of Delegates
 David Kellermann, former CFO of Freddie Mac
 Lester Kinsolving, reporter, columnist, and talk show host
 Michael McCrary, retired National Football League player
 Robert M. McDowell, former commissioner at the Federal Communications Commission
 Heather Mercer, Christian missionary held captive in Afghanistan in 2001
 John Myung, professional poker player
 Héctor Andrés Negroni, first Puerto Rican graduate of the United States Air Force Academy
Alketas Panagoulias, a Greek, former association football player and manager. He managed the national teams of both Greece and the United States.
 Howard Phillips, conservative political activist
 Tony Rodham, American consultant and businessman who was the youngest brother of former First Lady, Senator, and Secretary of State Hillary Clinton
 Garrett Roe, U.S. Hockey Olympian
 Chris Samuels, former American football offensive tackle for the Washington Redskins
 Randy Scott, sportcaster, ESPN, and former stand-up comedian
 Kaleem Shah, American entrepreneur, and owner of Thoroughbred race horses.
 Alfred Dennis Sieminski, represented New Jersey's 13th congressional district from 1951 to 1959.
 Nick Sorensen, American football player for the Cleveland Browns
 Michael J. Sullivan (author), fantasy novelist
 Edwin Winans, United States Army general
 Frank Wolf, former Republican member of the United States House of Representatives

Points of interest
 Freeman Store and Museum (Vienna, Virginia)
 Jammin' Java coffeehouse and music club
 Meadowlark Botanical Gardens
 Terrorist Screening Center
 Wolf Trap National Park for the Performing Arts (located in the CDP of Wolf Trap, Virginia)

References

External links

 Town of Vienna

 
1767 establishments in Virginia
Populated places established in 1767
Towns in Fairfax County, Virginia
Towns in Virginia
Washington metropolitan area